A bogatyr is a folk or epic hero in Russian culture.

Bogatyr may also refer to:

Art
 The Bogatyr, a decorative oil on canvas panel painted by Mikhail Vrubel in 1898
 Bogatyrs, an 1898 painting by Viktor Vasnetsov

Entertainment
T-39 Bogatyr, a part of the video game Battlefield 2142
 The Bogatyr, Kostya Torzianin, a character in Lord of Snow and Shadows in The Tears of Artamon series of fantasy novels by Sarah Ash
 Bogatyri (comics), a fictional team of Russian superheroes published by Marvel Comics

Other uses
 Bogatyr class cruiser, a group of protected cruisers built for the Imperial Russian Navy in 1898–1907
 Russian cruiser Bogatyr, the lead ship of the class protected cruisers built for the Imperial Russian Navy
 Bogatyr battalion, a battalion formed in Qajar Iran made up of Russian deserters
 Bogatyr Ridge, a stratovolcano in the central part of Iturup Island, Kuril Islands, Russia
 Bogatyr Access Komir, the largest coal mining group in Kazakhstan

See also